Type I collagen is the most abundant collagen of the human body. It forms large, eosinophilic fibers known as collagen fibers. 
It is present in scar tissue, the end product when tissue heals by repair, as well as tendons, ligaments, the endomysium of myofibrils, the organic part of bone, the dermis, the dentin, and organ capsules.

Formation
The  gene produces the pro-alpha1(I) chain. This chain combines with another pro-alpha1(I) chain and also with a pro-alpha2(I) chain (produced by the  gene) to make a molecule of type I pro-collagen. These triple-stranded, rope-like pro-collagen molecules must be processed by enzymes outside the cell. Once these molecules are processed, they arrange themselves into long, thin fibrils that cross-link to one another in the spaces around cells. The cross-links result in the formation of very strong mature type I collagen fiber.

Clinical significance
See Collagen, type I, alpha 1#Clinical significance

Markers used to measure bone loss are not easily testable. Degradation of type 1 collagen releases metabolites that can be used to monitor resorption.

See also 
 Collagen
 Type II collagen
 Collagen, type I, alpha 1
 Collagen, type I, alpha 2
 Collagen, type III, alpha 1

References

Further reading

External links 
 

Collagens